Mirwais Maidan (Pashto/) is a modern neighborhood in the west of Kabul city. It is a part of Kabul's 3rd district. The Rahman Baba High School lies in this area of the city.

See also 
 Neighborhoods of Kabul
 Kote Sangi

References

https://web.archive.org/web/20141205052630/http://km.gov.af/en/news/9544

Neighborhoods of Kabul